The Seal of Charlotte was first established during the tenure of mayor Charles A. Bland, and was designed over a period stretching from 1911 to 1915. It was adopted on the city's first flag in 1929, which still remains in use today. This seal itself was rescinded at an unknown date and replaced with the present one. In its current form, it is the city's logo on a golden seal, and it is used to authorize executive documents from the city, including, but not limited to, mayoral proclamations and resolutions from the city council. Based on the adoption of the crown logo in 1985 with the current flags, it is possible the current seal could have been adopted at that time as well, however, this is unknown, and city archives from the era do not depict any seal.

Description and meaning

Original seal 
Symbolizing growth is a tree in the center, with rays radiating from behind it, symbolizing hope for the future. Hanging on the tree is a hornet's nest, a Revolutionary War-era symbol, symbolizing the role the city played during the time period. This is explained in a pamphlet produced by the city, reading:More symbolism related to the era can be found within on seal, with a Liberty Cap present, hanging on the tree besides the nest. Beneath the tree are two hands clasped. The date "1775" is found below the hands, the year the Mecklenburg Declaration of Independence was supposedly adopted, a year before the Continental Congress adopted their declaration.

Current seal 
The current seal is much simpler in design, simply featuring the city's service mark atop a golden seal. On official documents, a green ribbon is typically found below it. The crown references the city's nickname of The Queen City, which references its namesake, Queen Charlotte. It also represents unity of the city's agencies as they work in unison for the good of its residents.

Use 
The custodian of the seal is Charlotte's city clerk, who keeps it and all records and official documents bearing the seal. The City Clerk uses the corporate seal of Charlotte to certify that city records are authentic, exact reproductions of the originals.

References

Charlotte, North Carolina
Seals (insignia)